Jeserik Andreína Pinto Sequera (born 21 March 1990) is a Venezuelan swimmer. She competed in the women's 50 metre backstroke event at the 2017 World Aquatics Championships.

References

External links
 

1990 births
Living people
Venezuelan female swimmers
Female backstroke swimmers
Place of birth missing (living people)
Competitors at the 2006 South American Games
South American Games gold medalists for Venezuela
South American Games silver medalists for Venezuela
South American Games bronze medalists for Venezuela
South American Games medalists in swimming
Pan American Games competitors for Venezuela
Swimmers at the 2007 Pan American Games
Swimmers at the 2015 Pan American Games
Swimmers at the 2019 Pan American Games
Medalists at the 2007 Pan American Games
Pan American Games medalists in swimming
Pan American Games bronze medalists for Venezuela
Competitors at the 2010 Central American and Caribbean Games
Central American and Caribbean Games gold medalists for Venezuela
Central American and Caribbean Games silver medalists for Venezuela
Central American and Caribbean Games bronze medalists for Venezuela
Central American and Caribbean Games medalists in swimming
Swimmers at the 2020 Summer Olympics
Olympic swimmers of Venezuela
21st-century Venezuelan women